Galaporella is a genus of South American orb-weaver spiders containing the single species, Galaporella thaleri. It was first described by Herbert Walter Levi in 2009, and has only been found in Ecuador.

References

Araneidae
Monotypic Araneomorphae genera
Spiders of South America